Falima Teao (born 1931) was the , or head of government, of Tokelau from February 1997 to February 1998. The position of ulu of Tokelau rotates annually between the three faipule (one for each of the three atolls), who are elected for terms lasting three years.

In 2004, Teao was one of the two dentists resident on Fakaofo.

Notes

References
worldstatesmen.org

1931 births
Living people
Heads of Government of Tokelau
Members of the Parliament of Tokelau
People from Fakaofo
New Zealand dentists